Mohan Manoraj (born 16 November 1954) is the present Bishop in Karnataka Southern Diocese of the Church of South India, the sixth in succession, and occupies the Cathedra at the CSI-Shanthi Cathedral in Mangalore who has been consecrated on 14 December 2015.

Studies
Manoraj pursued two degrees in sociology, Bachelor of Arts and a Master of Arts from the University of Mysore.  As he was inclined to become a priest, he discerned his avocation and underwent ministerial formation at the Karnataka Theological College, Mangalore, a Seminary affiliated to the nation's first  University {a University under Section 2 (f) of the University Grants Commission Act, 1956}) with degree-granting authority validated by a Danish Charter and ratified by the Government of West Bengal under the Principalship of C. L. Furtado.

Ministry
Soon after Manoraj's ordination by D. P. Shettian, he was assigned ministerial roles in the Karnataka Southern Diocese of the Church of South India.  Manoraj later upgraded his academics by pursuing a postgraduate course at the Tamil Nadu Theological Seminary, Madurai specialising in Social Analysis under the notable Activist-Scholar Gabriele Dietrich.  After returning from Madurai, Manoraj taught for a year at the Karnataka Theological College, Mangalore between 1995-1996 and has been a visiting Teacher since then as he went back for pastoral ministry.  Before becoming a bishop, Manoraj was a priest at the CSI-Sawday Memorial Church in Mysore.

Bishopric
The Karnataka Southern Diocese was led by John Sadananda who resigned in 2013 on attaining superannuation resulting in sede vacante which the Church of South India Synod deliberated and appointed Manoraj at the CSI-Shanthi Cathedral, Mangalore on 15 December 2014 as the sixth bishop.  Manoraj was principally consecrated by G. Dyvasirvadam the moderator as well as by Thomas K Oommen the deputy moderator in the presence of other clergy of the Church of South India.

References

Christian clergy from Karnataka
Kannada people
21st-century Anglican bishops in India
Anglican bishops of Karnataka Southern
1954 births
Indian Christian theologians
Senate of Serampore College (University) alumni
University of Mysore alumni
Academic staff of the Senate of Serampore College (University)
Living people
Tamil Nadu Theological Seminary alumni